Clarence Malcolm Simpson (26 September 1933 – 7 December 2020) was a New Zealand cyclist who represented his country at the 1952 Olympic Games.

At the 1950 British Empire Games at Auckland he came sixth in the 1 km time trial. At the 1952 Summer Olympics at Helsinki he came 11th in the 1 km time trial and was eliminated in the quarter-finals of the tandem sprint.

Simpson died in Takapuna on 7 December 2020.

References 

 Black Gold by Ron Palenski (2008, 2004 New Zealand Sports Hall of Fame, Dunedin) p. 83

External links 

1933 births
2020 deaths
Olympic cyclists of New Zealand
Cyclists at the 1952 Summer Olympics
Cyclists at the 1950 British Empire Games
Commonwealth Games competitors for New Zealand
Cyclists from Auckland
20th-century New Zealand people